Copăcioasa may refer to several places in Romania:

 Copăcioasa, a village in Scoarța Commune, Gorj County
 Copăcioasa, a village in Florești Commune, Mehedinți County
 Copăcioasa, a tributary of the river Berivoi in Brașov County

See also 
 Copăceni (disambiguation)